Pirogov Glacier is a 5 km long and 1.5 km wide glacier situated south of Djerassi Glacier, west of the head of Mackenzie Glacier and northwest of Balanstra Glacier on Brabant Island in the Palmer Archipelago, Antarctica.  It drains the south-southwest slopes of Mount Parry and flows westwards to enter Dallmann Bay south of Minot Point.

The glacier is named for the Russian scientist and surgeon Nikolay Pirogov (1810-1881) who developed modern health care in Bulgaria during the 1877-78 Russo-Turkish War.

Location
British mapping in 1980 and 2008.

See also
 List of glaciers in the Antarctic
 Glaciology

Maps
 Antarctic Digital Database (ADD). Scale 1:250000 topographic map of Antarctica. Scientific Committee on Antarctic Research (SCAR). Since 1993, regularly upgraded and updated.
British Antarctic Territory. Scale 1:200000 topographic map. DOS 610 Series, Sheet W 64 62. Directorate of Overseas Surveys, Tolworth, UK, 1980.
Brabant Island to Argentine Islands. Scale 1:250000 topographic map. British Antarctic Survey, 2008.

References
 Pirogov Glacier. SCAR Composite Gazetteer of Antarctica
 Bulgarian Antarctic Gazetteer. Antarctic Place-names Commission. (details in Bulgarian, basic data in English)

External links
 Pirogov Glacier. Copernix satellite image

Glaciers of the Palmer Archipelago
Bulgaria and the Antarctic
Brabant Island